Sir Horace Darwin,  (13 May 1851 – 22 September 1928), was an English engineer specializing in the design and manufacture of precision scientific instruments.  He was a Fellow of Trinity College, Cambridge.

Personal life and education 

Darwin was born in Down House in 1851, the fifth son and ninth child of the British naturalist Charles Darwin and his wife Emma, and the youngest of their seven children who survived to adulthood.

He was educated at a private school in Woodbridge, Suffolk, and at Trinity College, Cambridge, where he graduated BA in 1874. 

In January 1880 Darwin and Emma Cecilia "Ida" Farrer married. She was the daughter of Thomas Farrer, 1st Baron Farrer and was styled Lady Ida Darwin after her marriage. They had one son and two daughters:
 Erasmus Darwin IV (7 December 1881 – 24 April 1915) was killed in the Second Battle of Ypres during the First World War.
 Ruth Frances Darwin (1883–1972), married Dr. William Rees-Thomas, was a notable advocate of eugenics.
 Emma Nora Darwin (1885–1989) plant geneticist, edited the 1959 edition of The Autobiography of Charles Darwin and married the civil servant Sir Alan Barlow.

He is buried at the Parish of the Ascension Burial Ground in Cambridge with his wife; his brother Sir Francis Darwin is interred in the same graveyard. His other brother Sir George Darwin is buried in the Trumpington Extension Cemetery, Cambridge.

His family home, "the Orchard", in Huntingdon Road, Cambridge, is now the site of Murray Edwards College.

Career
In 1881 he co-founded the Cambridge Scientific Instrument Company with Albert George Dew-Smith. Darwin led the company when the partnership ended in 1891.  He was Mayor of Cambridge between 1896 and 1897, became a Fellow of the Royal Society in 1903 and was knighted in 1918.

References

External links
 
Darwin Correspondence database

English civil engineers
Darwin–Wedgwood family
Fellows of the Royal Society
Alumni of Trinity College, Cambridge
Knights Commander of the Order of the British Empire
People from Downe
1851 births
1928 deaths
Mayors of Cambridge